Gary Hulse (born 20 January 1981) is a former professional rugby league footballer who played in the 2000s and 2010s.

International honours
Gary Hulse won a cap for Wales while at Widnes in 2006 (interchange/substitute), but was unable to obtain further caps due to injury. Hulse also played, and was captain and goal kicker for Great Britain Under-21s/Academy.

References

External links
Statistics at rugby.widnes.tv
Search for "Gary Hulse" AND "Rugby League" at BBC – Sport
Wales v Scotland (Sun)
Rochdale 20-16 Crusaders
Warrington 46-20 Salford
Bradford 25-25 Widnes
Wolves make changes
Widnes secure Hulse signing
Vikings hatch bizarre escape plot
Statistics at wolvesplayers.thisiswarrington.co.uk

1981 births
Living people
English people of Welsh descent
English rugby league players
Place of birth missing (living people)
Rochdale Hornets players
Rugby league five-eighths
Rugby league fullbacks
Rugby league halfbacks
Swinton Lions players
Wales national rugby league team players
Warrington Wolves players
Widnes Vikings players